Kirk is found as an element in many place names in Scotland, England, and North America. It is derived from kirk, meaning General Assembly ”Government” and "Church". In Scotland, it is sometimes an English translation from a Scots Gaelic form involving cille or eaglais, both words for 'church'. Rarely it is found in Anglicisations of Continental European placenames which originally had Dutch kerk or a related form.

List
Kirk by itself is the name of two places:
Kirk, Caithness, Highland
Kirk, Colorado, a US town

More usually it is an element in a compound name.  The remainder of this article is a list of some of these.

In Scotland
Ashkirk, Scottish Borders
Falkirk
Halkirk, Caithness, Highland
Kirkbuddo, Angus
Kirkburn, Scottish Borders
Kirkcowan, Dumfries and Galloway
Kirkcudbright, Dumfries and Galloway
Kirkconnel, Dumfries and Galloway
Kirkfieldbank, South Lanarkshire
Kirkhill, Highland
Kirkhill, South Lanarkshire
Kirkhope, Scottish Borders
Kirkliston, Edinburgh
Kirkmaiden, Dumfries and Galloway
Kirkmichael, South Ayrshire
Kirkmuirhill, South Lanarkshire
Kirknewton, West Lothian
Kirkoswald, South Ayrshire
Kirkton of Skene, Aberdeenshire, and many other Kirktons, all tiny, and mostly matched with a Castleton or a Milton.
Kirk, Caithness, Highland
Kirkton (various)
Kirkwall, Orkney
Kirkwood, Coatbridge
Kirkwood Estate, East Ayrshire
Kirk Yetholm, Scottish Borders
Prestonkirk, East Lothian
Selkirk, Scottish Borders

In certain situations however, apparent instances of Kirk are, in their first element, from the Scots Gaelic word Cathair meaning a seat or fortress.
Kirkcaldy, Fife
Kirkintilloch

In England (by Lieutenancy area)
County Durham
Kirk Merrington
Romaldkirk (formerly North Riding of Yorkshire)
Cambridge
Kirkham
Kirkgate
Chadkirk, Cheshire
Cumbria
Kirkbride
Kirkby-in-Furness
Kirkby Kendal
Kirkoswald
Kirkland, Allerdale
Kirkland, Copeland
Kirkland, Eden
Kirkstone Pass
Lancashire/ Merseyside
Kirkdale, Liverpool, Merseyside
Kirkby, Merseyside
Kirkham
Kirkland
Kirkholt
Ormskirk
Church Kirk (meaning church church)
Colkirk, Norfolk
Peakirk, Northamptonshire
Nottinghamshire
Kirkby-in-Ashfield
Kirklington
Northumberland
Kirkharle
Kirkhaugh
Kirkheaton
Kirknewton
Kirkley, Suffolk
Lincolnshire
Kirkby on Bain
Kirkstead
Yorkshire
East Riding of Yorkshire
Kirkburn
North Yorkshire
Kirkbymoorside
Kirkdale
Kirkham
Kirklevington
Kirkleatham
Kirklington
Felixkirk
West Yorkshire
Kirkhamgate
Kirkheaton
Kirklees
Kirkstall
Kirkburton
Kirkby Lonsdale, Westmoreland

In France
Dunkirk, Nord-Pas-de-Calais (from Dutch Duinkerke; French Dunkerque)
In North America
Kirkpatrick, Oregon, United States
Newkirk, Oklahoma, United States
Kirkland, Washington, United States
Selkirk, Manitoba, Canada, named after Thomas Douglas, 5th Earl of Selkirk

References

See also
 Kirk - main article
 Kirk (disambiguation)
 Kirk (surname)
 Kirk (given name)
 List of generic forms in British place names
 Aber and Inver as place-name elements

Place name element etymologies
Prefixes
English suffixes
Infixes